Dimethylethylenediamine may refer to:

 1,1-Dimethylethylenediamine
 1,2-Dimethylethylenediamine (DMEDA)

Diamines